William James Pascrell Jr.  (born January 25, 1937) is an American politician who is the U.S. representative for , having served in the House since 1997. A member of the Democratic Party and a native of Paterson, New Jersey, Pascrell represented  until 2013; due to the federally mandated redistricting after the 2010 United States census, which resulted in New Jersey losing a seat in the House, Pascrell's home city was placed in the 9th district, which he has represented since. Before his election to the House of Representatives, Pascrell served in the New Jersey General Assembly for four terms beginning in 1988, and was elected to two terms as mayor of Paterson.

Early life, education, and academic career
The grandson of Italian immigrants, Pascrell was born in Paterson, New Jersey, the son of Roffie J. (née Loffredo) and William James Pascrell (originally Pascrelli). He attended St. George's Elementary School, and in 1955 graduated from St. John the Baptist High School, where he was elected student council president. He served in the United States Army and United States Army reserves. Pascrell attended Fordham University in New York City and earned a bachelor's degree in journalism and a master's degree in philosophy.

Pascrell spent 12 years as a high school teacher in Paramus, New Jersey, teaching several subjects including psychology, before being hired as a professor at Fairleigh Dickinson University. He was appointed to the Paterson Board of Education, and served as president of the board. He also served on Passaic County Community College's board of trustees.

Early political career

State Assembly
Pascrell first ran for elected office in 1987, when he ran for the New Jersey General Assembly seat being vacated by the retiring Vincent O. Pellecchia. He and incumbent Assemblyman John Girgenti retained the District 35 seats for the Democrats by defeating Republican nominees Martin Barnes, a Paterson city councilman, and Robert Angele, who worked in the city housing administration. Pascrell received 34% of the vote, enough to earn him the seat.

Pascrell and Girgenti were reelected in 1989 over Republicans Joaquin Calcines, Jr. and Jose Moore, with Pascrell polling at 36%.

After District 35 State Senator Frank Graves died suddenly in 1990, Girgenti was appointed to serve in Graves's place and a special election was called to fill the Assembly seat alongside Pascrell. Hawthorne's Frank Catania, a Republican, defeated Cyril Yannarelli, whom the Democrats appointed to the seat, in the special election that November.

In 1991 Pascrell and Eli Burgos ran for the Assembly on the Democratic ticket. The Republican ticket saw a returning Barnes look to take Pascrell's seat alongside Catania and shift the district to the GOP. In a tight race, the incumbents retained their seats with Pascrell as the leading vote-getter, with 29%.

In 1993, Pascrell and Reverend Alfred E. Steele of Paterson attempted to put Democrats in full control of District 35 again while Catania ran with Paterson's Harvey Nutter to try to win the seats for the Republicans. Once again, the incumbents won, with Pascrell as the leading vote-getter, at 31%. Catania had a tighter race with Steele.

Pascrell and Steele broke through as a pair and won control of the Assembly seats for the Democrats in 1995. Facing Donald Hayden, who was appointed to the seat after Catania was selected to serve in a state administrative position, and Dennis Gonzalez in the general election, both emerged with significant victories and Pascrell once again topped out at 33%. He eventually became Minority Leader Pro Tempore.

Pascrell resigned from the General Assembly in January 1997 in order to take his seat in the House of Representatives; his replacement was Nellie Pou.

Mayor of Paterson
While serving in the state legislature, Pascrell stayed active in city politics. In March 1990, a new opportunity arose.

Pascrell's colleague Frank Graves died suddenly from a massive heart attack on March 5. This created two vacancies that needed to be filled, and the State Senate seat Graves occupied was filled by John Girgenti. While in the Senate, Graves was elected mayor of Paterson twice, in 1982 and 1986. At the time of his death, he was preparing to run for a third term. Pascrell declared his candidacy for the seat shortly thereafter.

Pascrell faced City Council President Reverend Albert P. Rowe, Passaic County Freeholder Michael Adamo, and former councilman and police officer Roy Griffin in the nonpartisan election. Pascrell won with 51.4% of the vote and was sworn in on July 1 of that year, while keeping his seat in the General Assembly.

Pascrell ran for a second term in 1994 and faced two challengers, his former District 35 rival Martin Barnes and long-standing Sixth Ward councilman and former mayor Tom Rooney. Pascrell won the three-way contest with 46% of the vote.

Pascrell resigned as mayor on January 3, 1997, in order to take his Congressional seat. The city council appointed Barnes to replace him.

U.S. House of Representatives

Elections
In 1996, Pascrell ran for the Democratic nomination in New Jersey's Eighth Congressional District. The seat had been reliably Democratic for many years, with Robert A. Roe serving from 1969 until 1993 and the Democrats winning the seat in every election between 1960 and 1992. But in the 1994 Republican Revolution, NJ-8 became a GOP-held seat when Bill Martini, a Clifton councilman and Passaic County freeholder, defeated Roe's successor Herbert Klein. Pascrell won the nomination and the seat, defeating the incumbent with 51% of the vote. He has never faced another contest nearly that close; since then, he has been reelected with at least 62% of the vote.

2012 

After redistricting, Pascrell's home was placed in the newly redrawn 9th district. Fellow Democratic congressman Steve Rothman decided to move into the reconfigured 9th and challenge Pascrell in the primary. Rothman's home in Fair Lawn had been drawn into a Republican-leaning district against Republican Scott Garrett. Geographically, the new district was more Rothman's district than Pascrell's. Rothman had represented 53% of the new 9th, while Pascrell had represented 43%. Despite this, Pascrell defeated Rothman in the June 5 Democratic primary, 31,435 to 19,947, capturing about 61% of the vote.

In the general election, he faced Rabbi Shmuley Boteach. Pascrell raised more money than any other congressional candidate in the nation in 2012, $2.6 million, 10x what Boteach raised. Pascrell won  in the overwhelmingly Democratic district, where Democrats outnumbered Republicans by 3-to-1, by a margin of 73.6% to 25.4%.

2012 election controversy
Rothman's candidacy in the 2012 primary race reportedly devolved into a highly competitive proxy war over Israel. American Arab Forum president Aref Assaf published a column in The Star-Ledger, "Rothman is Israel's Man in District 9", in which he wrote:

As total and blind support becomes the only reason for choosing Rothman, voters who do not view the elections in this prism will need to take notice. Loyalty to a foreign flag is not loyalty to America's [flag].

Pascrell supporters reportedly produced Arabic-language campaign posters encouraging the "Arab diaspora community" to elect Pascrell, "the friend of the Arabs." The posters called the race "the most important election in the history of the [Arab American] community."

Jewish Voice and Opinion publisher Susan Rosenbluth wrote that "a number of Arab-American constituents have come out with outrageous attacks on Rothman" and "I haven't heard a dual loyalty charge for years." She also sharply criticized Pascrell for remaining silent and refusing to condemn the charges of dual loyalty.

Tenure

On October 10, 2002, Pascrell was among 81 Democratic House members to vote to authorize the invasion of Iraq.

Pascrell was one of the original members of the Homeland Security Committee, eventually rising to the post of ranking member on the Emergency Preparedness Subcommittee. He has a particular interest in fire safety, and authored the bill that created the Assistance to Firefighters Grant Program, which gives federal grants directly to all fire departments, including volunteer fire departments, which he calls "the forgotten part of the public safety equation".

Pascrell was also a member of the House Transportation Committee, where he worked to modernize roads, bridges, airports and mass transit systems. He has secured funding for reconstructing various dangerous New Jersey roads and bridges, including the Route 46 corridor. In addition, he has helped craft legislation to renew federal surface transportation programs, providing funding for New Jersey Transit. The legislation concerned projects of rail expansion between Passaic and Bergen Counties, bridge construction throughout Route 46, and the establishment of a bike-pedestrian path in South Orange.

Pascrell is an Italian American and has been outspoken about Italian Americans' stereotypical representation in shows such as HBO's The Sopranos. His Italian heritage was questioned by comedian Stephen Colbert of The Colbert Report, who alleged in an interview that Pascrell could not truly be of Italian descent because Italian surnames must end with a vowel. Pressed by Colbert for an example of an Italian surname ending in a consonant, Pascrell responded with "Sole".

During Bruce Springsteen and the E Street Band's 2009 Working on a Dream Tour, Pascrell asked the Federal Trade Commission and the U.S. Department of Justice to investigate the practices of Ticketmaster and TicketsNow in regard to sales of tickets to the tour's New Jersey shows. He subsequently introduced federal legislation, the "BOSS ACT" (Better Oversight of Secondary Sales and Accountability in Concert Ticketing), to require primary ticket sellers to disclose how many tickets were being held back from sale, prohibit ticket brokers from buying tickets during the first 48 hours on sale, and prohibit primary ticket sellers, promoters, and artists from entering the secondary market. In 2012, problems again arose during the ticket sales for Springsteen's 2012 Wrecking Ball Tour. Ticketmaster said web traffic was 2.5 times its highest level for the year. Shows were selling out within minutes and many tickets at much higher prices appeared on resale websites such as StubHub less than an hour after the onsale time. Pascrell said he would reintroduce the BOSS ACT.

In October 2008, after the death of a young boy in his district who returned to playing football without having fully recovered from a concussion sustained earlier in the season, Pascrell introduced the Concussion Treatment and Care Tools Act (ConTACT), which has been endorsed by the National Football League, the National Football League Players Association, and the Brain Injury Association of America. ConTACT brings together a conference of experts to produce a guidelines for the treatment and care of concussions for middle- and high-school students. It also provides funding for schools' adoption of baseline and post-injury neuropsychological testing technologies.

In January 2011, in response to the shooting of Representative Gabby Giffords, Pascrell said, "[t]here's an aura of hate and elected politicians feed it. Certain people on Fox News feed it."

On March 12, 2013, Pascrell introduced the Traumatic Brain Injury Reauthorization Act of 2013 (H.R. 1098; 113th Congress), a bill that would reauthorize appropriations for Centers for Disease Control and Prevention (CDC) projects to reduce the incidence of traumatic brain injury and projects related to track and monitor traumatic brain injuries. He is the co-founder and co-chair of the Congressional Brain Injury Task Force, which was founded in 2001 and now includes more than 100 members of Congress.

On December 11, 2020, Pascrell, citing the 14th Amendment (§3, specifically), called for House Speaker Nancy Pelosi not to seat Republicans who signed an amicus curiae brief supporting Texas v. Pennsylvania plaintiff Ken Paxton, Texas Attorney General. This proposal would not seat nearly two-thirds of the Republican representatives of the incoming 117th United States Congress. Pascrell said, "The text of the 14th Amendment expressly forbids Members of Congress from engaging in rebellion against the United States. Trying to overturn a democratic election and install a dictator seems like a pretty clear example of that."

Committee assignments
 Committee on Ways and Means
 Chairman, Subcommittee on Oversight

Caucus memberships
 Law Enforcement Caucus (co-chair)
 Congressional Fire Services Caucus (co-chair)
 Congressional History Caucus (co-chair)
 Congressional Home Protection Caucus (co-chair)
 House Textile Caucus (co-chair)
 House Baltic Caucus
 Congressional Arts Caucus
U.S.-Japan Caucus
Blue Collar Caucus

Party leadership
 Steering and Policy Committee, Region IX representative (New Jersey, Delaware, Maryland, Virginia, and Washington D.C.)

Electoral history

*Write-in and minor candidate notes: In 1998, Stephen Spinosa received 762 votes; Bernard George received 722 votes; Thomas Paine Caslander received 625 votes; and José L. Aravena received 318 votes. 
In 2000, Viji Sargis received 983 votes.

References

External links

 Congressman Bill Pascrell official U.S. House website
 Bill Pascrell for Congress

 

|-

|-

|-

1937 births
21st-century American politicians
American people of Italian descent
Fairleigh Dickinson University faculty
Fordham University alumni
Living people
Democratic Party members of the United States House of Representatives from New Jersey
Mayors of Paterson, New Jersey
Democratic Party members of the New Jersey General Assembly
Military personnel from New Jersey
School board members in New Jersey
Schoolteachers from New Jersey